The Dumagute Uni-Bikers are a baseball team in the Philippines that was formed in 2007. Dumaguete joined the league during its second season.  The team is owned by Felipe Antonio B. Remollo.

Roster
 Darwin de la Calzada # 13 Philippine Team
 Marlon Caspillo # 33
 Andro Cuyugan # 11 Philippine Team
 Christopher de la Cerna # 45
 Christian de Leon # 7
 Edmer del Socorro # 32 Philippine Team
 Denver Largo # 25
 Francisco Ramos # 14
 Bambol Servo # 44
 Jeffrey Sinangote # 52
 Edward Tuazon # 21
 Richard Tubillo # 99
 Kelly Culubong # 8 Player/Coach
 Lito Pulgo # 28 Player/ Manager

Tournament results

Playoff results
2007 Series Two Division Series- Lost to Cebu Dolphins

References

External links
 Baseball Philippines Official Site: Dumaguete Uni-Bikers

Baseball teams established in 2007
Baseball Philippines
Baseball teams in the Philippines
Sports in Negros Oriental
Dumaguete
2007 establishments in the Philippines